Vish may refer to:

 Vish (game), a game in which players compete to find circularity in a dictionary
 Vish Dhamija, British-Indian crime-fiction writer
 Vish, Hindi TV Show